Elza Tillman Renfro (April 3, 1902 – September 21, 1935) was an American football, basketball, and baseball player and coach of football, basketball, and track. He served as the head football coach at Arkansas State College—now known as Arkansas State University—for one season in 1933, compiling a record of 2–4–2.

Renfro died of blood poisoning in 1935.

Head coaching record

References

External links
 

1902 births
1935 deaths
American men's basketball players
Arkansas Razorbacks baseball players
Arkansas Razorbacks football players
Arkansas Razorbacks men's basketball players
Arkansas State Red Wolves football coaches
Arkansas State Red Wolves men's basketball coaches
Centenary Gentlemen football coaches
College track and field coaches in the United States
Deaths from sepsis